Angela Margaret Jane "Anji" Hunter (born 1955) is an English public relations advisor. She is noted for her close partnership with former Prime Minister Tony Blair.

Early life
Hunter was born in Kuala Lumpur, Federation of Malaya, then under control of the British Empire. Her father was a rubber plantation manager. She was educated at St Leonards School in St Andrews, Scotland, and St. Clare's, Oxford, a school whose sixth form she attended. She first met Tony Blair while still in Scotland, at the age of 15.

Hunter gained a first in history and English in 1988 from the Brighton Polytechnic.

Career 
After graduating, Hunter began working for Tony Blair, now an MP, as his political assistant. She became Director of Government Relations for Blair's government in 1997, and was described as "the most influential non-elected person in Downing Street".

In 2001 she left Downing Street to become Director of Communications at the oil and gas company BP in 2002. In 2009 she was appointed Director of External Affairs for Anglo American plc. She is a board member of the Snowdon Trust, founded by the Earl of Snowdon, which provides grants and scholarships for students with disabilities.

In 2013 Hunter joined the international public relations and marketing consultancy Edelman to advise clients on corporate reputation, crisis management and public affairs, as well as helping promote senior women in business.

Personal life
Hunter married the landscape gardener Nick Cornwall in 1980. The couple had two children. In 2002 The Daily Telegraph published a report about a relationship between Hunter and the political editor of Sky News Adam Boulton, while she was still working at Downing Street. Cornwall and Hunter divorced following the revelation. Hunter married Boulton in 2006.

References 

1955 births
Alumni of the University of Brighton
British political consultants
British public relations people
Living people
People from Brechin
People educated at St Leonards School
BP people
British special advisers
Labour Party (UK) officials